The 2019 Sun Belt Conference baseball tournament will be held at Springs Brooks Stadium on the campus of the Coastal Carolina University in Conway, South Carolina, from May 21st to May 26th, 2019.  The tournament will again use a double-elimination format.  The winner of the tournament will earn the Sun Belt Conference's automatic bid to the 2019 NCAA Division I baseball tournament.

Seeding
In a change from previous years, the top ten teams (based on conference results) from the conference earn invites to the tournament.  The teams will be seeded based on conference winning percentage, with the bottom four seeds competing in a play-in round.  The remaining eight teams will then play a two bracket, double-elimination tournament.  The winner of each bracket will play a championship final.

Results

Play-in round

Double-elimination round

Conference championship

References

Tournament
Sun Belt Conference Baseball Tournament
Sun Belt baseball tournament
Sun Belt Conference baseball tournament